The Warrensville Heights City School District is a public school district based in Warrensville Heights, Ohio (USA).

In addition to Warrensville Heights, the district also serves the villages of Highland Hills and North Randall.

Schools

High school
Grades 8-12
Warrensville Heights High School

Middle school
Grades 6-7
Warrensville Heights Middle School
Grades Pre-K - 2
John Dewey Elementary School
3 -5'''
Eastwood Elementary School

Enrollment
2006-07 School Year: 2,536 students
2005-06 School Year: 2,859 students
2004-05 School Year: 2,828 students
2003-04 School Year: 2,821 students
2002-03 School Year: 2,996 students

District during the 2010-2011  There Were A Total Of 5,579
There were a total of 2,536 students enrolled in the Warrensville Heights City School District during the 2006-2007 school year. The gender makeup of the district was 48.06% female and 51.94% male. The racial makeup of the district was 98.82% African American, 0.39% White, 0.24% Hispanic, 0.47% Multiracial, and 0.08% Asian/Pacific Islander.

See also
List of school districts in Ohio

References

External links
Warrensville Heights City School District

School districts in Cuyahoga County, Ohio